A basilisk is a legendary reptile reputed to be king of serpents.

Basilisk may also refer to:


People
Basiliscus, Roman emperor (475–476).

Nonfictional uses
Common basilisk, a lizard found in Central and South American rainforests
 Any lizard of the genus Basiliscus
 Common basilisk, a Mediterranean plant
 Basilisk (The Legendary Pink Dots album), an album by The Legendary Pink Dots
 Basilisk (D'erlanger album), an album by D'erlanger
 Basilisk (cannon)
 HMAS Basilisk, a naval base
 HMS Basilisk, the name of several Royal Navy ships
 Basilisk II, a software emulator
 Basilisk (web browser), developed by the Pale Moon team
 Basilisk, Queensland, a locality in the Cassowary Coast Region, Queensland, Australia

Fictional uses
 Basilisk (comics), the name of four Marvel Comics characters
 Basilisk, a fictional terrorist group seen in the DC Comics Suicide Squad
 Basilisk (Harry Potter)
 Basilisk (manga), a manga and anime series
 A motif in the works of author David Langford
 A star system in the David Weber novel On Basilisk Station
 Roko's basilisk, a thought experiment originating on the LessWrong blog